Xavier Usel (born 16 April 2000) is a French-speaking Italian footballer from Aosta Valley who plays as a midfielder. He plays for Aygreville Calcio.

Club career
Usel was born in Aosta. His first professional team was Alessandria, he made his professional debut in the 2017–18 season, on 20 March 2018 against Carrarese, coming in as a substitute for Gianluca Nicco in the 74th minute.

On 13 July 2019, he joined Fiorenzuola on loan. The loan was terminated by mutual consent on 11 September 2019.

References

Sources
 
 
 

2000 births
Living people
People from Aosta
Footballers from Aosta Valley
Association football midfielders
Italian footballers
U.S. Alessandria Calcio 1912 players
U.S. Fiorenzuola 1922 S.S. players
Serie C players